Granite Park Chalet is located in the heart of Glacier National Park in the U.S. state of Montana at an elevation of 6,693 feet above sea level. The chalet was built in 1914 by the Great Northern Railway and is a National Historic Landmark contributing property, being one of five structures in the 
Great Northern Railway Buildings district. From Logan Pass along the Going-to-the-Sun Road, the chalet is a moderate  hike along the famed Crown of the Continent Highline Trail, usually referred to simply as the Highline Trail. Much of the trail passes through the scenic Garden Wall section of the park, immediately west and parallel to the Continental Divide.  The chalet is also accessible via the Loop Trail (elevation gain) and the Swiftcurrent Trail (elevation gain).  The trails are for hikers and horseback riders only; no vehicle access is provided.  Granite Park Chalet is a limited services facility and those that spend the night make use of the full service kitchen to cook their own meals.

References

External links
 
 
 

Hotel buildings on the National Register of Historic Places in Montana
Mountain huts in the United States
National Historic Landmarks in Montana
Great Northern Railway (U.S.) hotels
Houses completed in 1913
Rustic architecture in Montana
Hotels in Montana
Historic district contributing properties in Montana
1913 establishments in Montana
National Register of Historic Places in Flathead County, Montana
National Register of Historic Places in Glacier National Park
Swiss Chalet Revival architecture